Forest floor interception is the part of the (net) precipitation or throughfall that is temporarily stored in the top layer of the forest floor and successively evaporated within a few hours or days during and after the rainfall event. The forest floor can consist of bare soil, short vegetation (like grasses, mosses, creeping vegetation, etc.) or litter (i.e. leaves, twigs, or small branches).

See also
 Interception (water)
 Canopy interception

Further reading
 Gerrits, A.M.J., Savenije, H.H.G., Hoffmann, L. and Pfister, L. (2007): New technique to measure forest floor interception – an application in a beech forest in Luxembourg, Hydrology and Earth System Sciences, 11, 695–701.

References

Hydrology
Forest ecology